Luana Elídia Afonso Piovani (born 29 August 1976) is a Brazilian actress, TV host, and former model.

Career 
Piovani started her career as a Ford Models Agency model in 1990 and a year later spent some time working in Japan.

Piovani's first television appearance was in the 1992 miniseries Sex Appeal, on Rede Globo. She also had a role in the Você Decide series. Her first soap opera role was in 1994's Quatro por Quatro. She appeared in the Luis Ferré's film Super Colosso and made a special appearance in the A Comédia da Vida Privada series. Her first theater play was Nó de Gravata, in 1996.

In 1997, she was voted the sexiest woman on earth by Editora Abril's VIP magazine. In the same year, she starred in Malhação. She also appeared in D'Artagnan e os Três Mosqueteiros, Sai de Baixo, Mulher, Os Normais and Sítio do Picapau Amarelo.

In 1999, she produced and starred  in A.M.I.G.A.S. in the theater. In addition, she hosted the show  Tudo de Bom, at MTV Brasil and The Video Music Awards of that year. She also starred in the long-running children's play Alice in Wonderland. She also joined the cast of Saia Justa, from GNT (Globosat), along with the co-hostesses Betty Lago (actress), Márcia Tiburi (philosopher) and Monica Waldvogel (journalist).

In 2002, Luana made an appearance at Fashion Rio, the biggest fashion event in Latin America, following São Paulo Fashion Week, earning some notoriety when she catwalked absolutely naked above the waist, holding her breasts.

In 2006, stepping aside from her pin-up image, Luana took a chance in children's theater, producing and starring in the leading role in Antoine de Saint Exupéry's O Pequeno Príncipe. The play was a hit with children.

In 2009, she starred in the movie A Mulher Invisível. She also made a cameo in the series Ó Paí, Ó.

In 2010, she was one of the protagonists of the series In the Na Forma da Lei, where she played the delegate Gabriela. Currently, the show enacts O Soldadinho e a Bailarina. Inspired by the classic children's literature, The Steadfast Tin Soldier, by Hans Christian Andersen, the musical is the third foray into playwriting by Luana Piovani for children. In the same year she appeared in the film Eu Odeio o Orkut.

Luana says that she agreed to return the video because it was an invitation by her friend Wolf Maya, who says she is much admired and who claims to have an enormous affection. The text is signed by Antônio Calmon, who also wrote the miniseries Sex Appeal, which catapulted to fame. The former model also said that the novel does not intend to anytime soon.

Luana has a personal website and a weblog, where she shares her views of life with her online fans. She returned to the cinema in 2012 with the film As Aventuras de Agamenon, o Repórter.

In 2014, Luana was listed for the show Dupla Identidade, Glória Perez, where she played Vera in the police.

Personal life 
Piovani has dated entrepreneurs João Paulo Diniz, Ricardo Mansur and Christiano Rangel, actors Guilherme Fontes, Rodrigo Santoro, Marcos Palmeira, Dado Dolabella and Paulo Vilhena, the model Caco Ricci, and businessman Felipe Simão.

In 2011, she became pregnant with her first child, the fruit of her relationship with the surfer Pedro Scooby. Dom was born on March 26, 2012. On July 26, 2013, Piovani married Scooby in a private ceremony, in front of 275 guests. She now has three children: Dom, Bem and Liz.

Controversies 
Luana was involved in controversy, as already stated that she smoked marijuana and even got involved in fights with Dado Dolabella in October 2008.

In August 2011, Luana was angry for having appeared in the Profissão Repórter, TV show by Caco Barcellos on the Globo, which addressed the theme of life photographer. The actress refused an interview with one of the journalists of the show and went to his Twitter to complain about the place.

Filmography

Television

Film

Theater

References

External links

 
 Official website 

1976 births
Living people
Actresses from São Paulo
Brazilian people of Italian descent
Brazilian film actresses
Brazilian television actresses
Brazilian stage actresses
Brazilian evangelicals
21st-century Brazilian actresses
Citizens of Italy through descent
Brazilian emigrants to Portugal